Yanshan County is under the administration of the Wenshan Zhuang and Miao Autonomous Prefecture, in the southeast of Yunnan province, China.

Administrative divisions
In the present, Yanshan County has 4 towns 3 townships and 4 ethnic townships. 
4 towns

3 townships
 Baga
 Zhela
 Bang'e
4 ethnic townships

Transport
Nearest airport: Wenshan Airport

Climate

References

External links
Yanshan County Official Website

County-level divisions of Wenshan Prefecture